Jacqueline de Bueil (1588-1651), was a French noblewoman and mistress to Henry IV of France in 1604-1608.

Early life
She was born as daughter of Claude de Bueil, Seigneur de Courcillon (1537-1596) and his wife Catherine de Montcler.

Marriages and court life
Although firstly married to Philippe de Harlay| de Champvallon (1582-1652), Count de Césy, she had a child with the king, Antoine de Bourbon-Bueil (1606-1632). She was also known to have had affairs with several other men at court, among them with Claude de Lorraine, Duke of Chevreuse, and participated in several plots. In 1607 she divorced her husband and later married René II Crespin Crespin du Bec , Marquis de Vardes and had legitimate issue with him.

References 
 Hugh Noel Williams: Last Loves of Henri of Navarre. London: Hutchinson; pp. 154–156 (online).

1588 births
1651 deaths
17th-century French women
Mistresses of Henry IV of France